Tiarah is a Serbian nu metal band. The group was formed in 2005 in Senta, Serbia by Szabó Szebasztián and Marjan Mijić, alongside Márki Dániel, Lénárd Norbert, Újházi Tamás and Szabó Endre.

History

Early years
The band covered various artists in their first couple of years. Over time, they performed more of their own work. In 2005 they played their first gig, at the Rock Pub Rin-Tin-Tin in Senta. Later that year, Tiarah played many shows and recorded their first album named End Of Summer. In 2006, in the Sziget Festival the band gained recognition by performing on the Talentum stage, winning the Best Band award.

Member changes 
The first member change came after the first concert, when Szabó Endre left. Szabó Szebasztián left due to family reasons. The successor was Basic Zoltán (In Her Embrace guitarist). After one-year break they re-formed. Disagreements with the band caused him to leave the band. Later the young guitarist Lénárd Norbert joined the team.

Extinction Ceremony
In 2011 the band released their second album, Extinction Ceremony. The band was awarded the Serbian metal album of the year.

Personnel

Current members

Past members

Discography

Demo 
My Time
New Day
Just

End Of Summer (2006)
Wake me up
Frozen
Summertime
Sorry
Turn Away
What if
Silence
True Blue
Reborn

Violent Intentions (2010)
Burn
Violent Intentions

Extinction Ceremony (2011)
Burn
Pearl
Hate and Fury
Violent Intentions
Jitterburg (Delirium Tremens)
Gone Forever
Demented
Razoblades and Sugar
P.S.
Diane (Therapy? cover)
Stupid

External links
Tiarah at MyMusic
Tiarah interjú, 2009
Tiarah, Zenta

Serbian heavy metal musical groups
Nu metal musical groups
Musical groups established in 2005